Mordt is a surname, and may refer to:

 Bjorn Mordt (born 1978), Zimbabwean cricketer
 Nils Mordt, rugby player
 Per Edmund Mordt (born 1965), Norwegian football player
 Ray Mordt, rugby player